Kim Schreiner (born 1961 or 1962) is a Canadian politician who was elected in the 2015 Alberta general election to the Legislative Assembly of Alberta representing the electoral district of Red Deer-North. She is a member of the New Democratic Party.

Schreiner has held a number of Committee positions, including deputy chair of the Standing Committee on the Alberta Heritage Savings Trust Fund and member of the Special Standing Committee on Members’ Services and the Standing Committee on Alberta's Economic Future.

Electoral history

2019 general election

2015 general election

References

1960s births
Alberta New Democratic Party MLAs
Living people
People from Red Deer, Alberta
Women MLAs in Alberta
21st-century Canadian politicians
21st-century Canadian women politicians